Florin Lungu (born 9 July 1980, in Constanţa) is a former Romanian professional footballer.

Honours
Farul Constanța
Cupa României : Runner-up 2004–05

External links
 
 

1980 births
Living people
Sportspeople from Constanța
Romanian footballers
Association football midfielders
Liga I players
FCV Farul Constanța players